Marion County (standard abbreviation: MN) is a county located in the U.S. state of Kansas.  Its county seat is Marion and its most populous city is Hillsboro.  As of the 2020 census, the county population was 12,660. The county was named in honor of Francis Marion, a brigadier general of the American Revolutionary War, known as the "Swamp Fox".

History

Early history

For millennia, the Great Plains of North America were inhabited by nomadic Native Americans.  From the 16th to 18th centuries, the Kingdom of France claimed ownership of large parts of North America.  In 1762, after the French and Indian War, France secretly ceded New France to Spain, by the Treaty of Fontainebleau.

19th century
In 1802, Spain returned most of the land to France, but keeping title to about 7,500 square miles. In 1803, most of the land for modern day Kansas was acquired by the United States from France as part of the 828,000 square mile Louisiana Purchase for 2.83 cents per acre. In 1848, after the Mexican–American War, the Treaty of Guadalupe Hidalgo with Spain brought into the United States all or part of land for ten future states, including southwest Kansas.

In 1806, Zebulon Pike led the Pike Expedition westward from St Louis, Missouri, of which part of their journey followed the Cottonwood River through modern Marion County near the current cities of Florence, Marion, Durham.

In 1854, the Kansas Territory was organized, then in 1861 Kansas became the 34th U.S. state. In 1855, Marion County was established. The first settlers in Marion County located on Doyle Creek, near the present site of Florence. They were Moses Shane, who came in 1858, and whose death the next year was the first in the county; Patrick Doyle, in 1859, for whom Doyle Creek and Township were named, and a family by the name of Welsh, in which occurred the first birth in the county in August 1859. The city of Marion Centre was founded in 1860, became the county seat in 1865, and later the city name was shortened to Marion.

From 1821 to 1866, the Santa Fe Trail was active across Marion County.  In the spring of 1859, a trading post was established at the "Lost Spring" on the Santa Fe Trail, and in the autumn of the same year, the Moore brothers established a ranch near the present site of Durham, and the first post office was established at this place. Later in the same year, a post office was established at "Lost Spring" near the current city of Lost Springs. Previously the nearest post office was Emporia.

From 1867 to 1871, the Chisholm Trail was routed along the western edge of Marion County. The trail started in Texas and ended in Abilene, Kansas, where cattle were shipped eastward by rail. As the railroads were built westward and southward, the trail was truncated from going further north.

Originally, Marion County covered more than a third of the area of Kansas, including all the territory in the state south and west of the present northern and eastern lines of the county. The original location of the county was fixed by legislative act in 1860. It comprised less than the present area. The original boundaries were altered by an increase of territory on the west and a decrease on the south. In 1863, the legislature by special act fixed the boundaries to include all of southwestern Kansas. In June of that year, on petition of the citizens of the county, the governor restored the previous boundaries and ordered a separate organization of the county.  The south-eastern border one mile "notch" with Chase County was established under unusual circumstances. A murder had occurred and Marion County didn't want to have the trial, so a section one mile wide and eighteen miles long was ceded to Chase County to ensure the murder had occurred there.  The one mile strip of land remains in Chase County to this day. The present county boundary lines were decided upon in 1872 and contain twenty-four townships.

The first two-story courthouse of stone was built in 1867. The upper floor was used for county court and the first floor was used as a school. A high wall for a place of refuge and defense in the event of an Indian attack surrounded it, but it was never needed for that purpose. An addition was completed in 1879 and part of the original structure was remodeled in 1881. The present three-story native limestone structure was completed in 1907.

Santa Fe Railroad

The state of Kansas granted the Atchison and Topeka Railroad three million acres (12,000 km2) of land if it would build a continuous line to the western border of the state within ten years (March 1, 1873). In 1871, the railroad pushed westward from Emporia through Florence, Horners, and Peabody towards Newton, and got title to the land in 1873. The law therefore gave the railroad what was called "in lieu" lands further west. Eventually this worked out to be half the land on a strip  on each side of its track from Emporia nearly out to Kinsley, which meant that most of Marion County fell in this strip.

In 1877, the Florence, El Dorado, and Walnut Valley Railroad Company built a branch line from Florence to El Dorado, in 1881 it was extended to Douglass, and later to Arkansas City.  The line was leased and operated by the Atchison, Topeka and Santa Fe Railway. The line from Florence to El Dorado was abandoned in 1942.  The original branch line connected Florence, Burns, De Graff, El Dorado, Augusta, Douglass, Rock, Akron, Winfield, Arkansas City.

In 1887, Atchison, Topeka and Santa Fe Railway built a branch line from Neva (3 miles west of Strong City) to Superior, Nebraska. This branch line connected Strong City, Neva, Rockland, Diamond Springs, Burdick, Lost Springs, Jacobs, Hope, Navarre, Enterprise, Abilene, Talmage, Manchester, Longford, Oak Hill, Miltonvale, Aurora, Huscher, Concordia, Kackley, Courtland, Webber, Superior. At some point, the line from Neva to Lost Springs was pulled but the right of way has not been abandoned. This branch line was originally called "Strong City and Superior line" but later the name was shortened to the "Strong City line". The railway is connected via a switch to allow north-bound "Rock Island" traffic to connect onto the north-west-bound "Santa Fe" tracks. This is the only way for the Santa Fe traffic to travel north-west after removing the tracks to Neva.

As early as 1875, city leaders of Marion held a meeting to consider a branch railroad from Florence. In 1878, Atchison, Topeka and Santa Fe Railway and parties from Marion County and McPherson County chartered the Marion and McPherson Railway Company.  In 1879, a branch line was built from Florence to McPherson, in 1880 it was extended to Lyons, in 1881 it was extended to Ellinwood.  The line was leased and operated by the Atchison, Topeka and Santa Fe Railway. The line from Florence to Marion, was abandoned in 1968.  In 1992, the line from Marion to McPherson was sold to Central Kansas Railway. In 1993, after heavy flood damage, the line from Marion to McPherson was abandoned. The original branch line connected Florence, Oursler, Marion, Canada, Hillsboro, Lehigh, Canton, Galva, McPherson, Conway, Windom, Little River, Mitchell, Lyons, Chase, Ellinwood.

In 1996, the Atchison, Topeka and Santa Fe Railway merged with Burlington Northern Railroad and renamed to the current BNSF Railway. Most locals still refer to this railroad as the "Santa Fe".

Rock Island Railroad

In 1887, the Chicago, Kansas and Nebraska Railway extended its main line from Herington to Pratt.  This main line connected Herington, Ramona, Tampa, Durham, Waldeck, Canton, Galva, McPherson, Groveland, Inman, Medora, Hutchinson, Whiteside, Partridge, Arlington,  Langdon, Turon, Preston, Natrona, Pratt. In 1888, this main line was extended to Liberal. Later, this line was extended to Tucumcari, New Mexico, and El Paso, Texas. This line is called the "Golden State Limited".

In 1887, the Chicago, Kansas and Nebraska Railway built a branch line north-south from Herington to Caldwell.  This branch line connected Herington, Lost Springs, Lincolnville, Antelope, Marion, Aulne, Peabody, Elbing, Whitewater, Furley, Kechi, Wichita, Peck, Corbin, Wellington, Caldwell. By 1893, this branch line was incrementally built to Fort Worth, Texas. This line is called the "OKT".

The "Rock Island" has switches in Peabody and Lost Springs to allow connections to the crossing "Santa Fe" railroad in each city.

The Chicago, Kansas and Nebraska Railway was foreclosed in 1891 and was taken over by Chicago, Rock Island and Pacific Railway, which shut down in 1980 and reorganized as Oklahoma, Kansas and Texas Railroad, merged in 1988 with Missouri Pacific Railroad, and finally merged in 1997 with Union Pacific Railroad. Most locals still refer to this railroad as the "Rock Island".

Chingawasa Springs Railroad
In 1889, the Marion Belt and Chingawasa Springs Railroad built a 4.5 mile railroad from Marion north-east to Chingawasa Springs. A hotel was built near the site of the spa at Chingawasa Springs, and a depot and eatery as well. Both Santa Fe and Rock Island offered round trip fares from Chicago and western cities to Chingawasa Springs. An economic panic in 1893 closed down the health spa and hotel, and quarry business along the tracks never developed sufficiently. In 1893, the railroad ceased operations, and tracks were removed in 1910.

20th century
The National Old Trails Road, also known as the Ocean-to-Ocean Highway, was established in 1912, and was routed through Lehigh, Hillsboro, Marion, Lost Springs. 

Peabody, and nearby Watchorn, experienced an oil boom from 1918 to 1920. The influence of the petroleum industry remained strong in Peabody, and resulted in the greatest change upon the community in the shortest time. More than 100 residences were constructed in October and November 1919. From 1918 to 1919, the population increased by 75% or more, but later decreased as oil booms in other Kansas areas needed the workers. 

From 1935 to 1937, the Marion County Lake was constructed southeast of Marion. From 1964 to 1968, the Marion Reservoir was constructed northwest of Marion.

21st century

In 2010, the Keystone-Cushing Pipeline (Phase II) was constructed north to south through Marion County with much controversy over road damage, tax exemption, and environmental concerns (if a leak ever occurs).

Geography

Marion County is located in the Great Plains, and the eastern part of the county is part of the Flint Hills.

Adjacent counties
 Dickinson County (north)
 Morris County (northeast)
 Chase County (east)
 Butler County (southeast)
 Harvey County (southwest)
 McPherson County (west)
 Saline County (northwest)

Demographics

2000 census
As of the census of 2000, there were 13,361 people, 5,114 households, and 3,687 families residing in the county. The population density was 14 people per square mile (5/km2). There were 5,882 housing units at an average density of 6 per square mile (2/km2). The racial makeup of the county was 97.06% White, 0.47% Black or African American, 0.59% Native American, 0.19% Asian, 0.01% Pacific Islander, 0.55% from other races, and 1.14% from two or more races. 1.92% of the population were Hispanic or Latino of any race.

There were 5,114 households, out of which 30.50% had children under the age of 18 living with them, 63.80% were married couples living together, 5.50% had a female householder with no husband present, and 27.90% were non-families. 25.20% of all households were made up of individuals, and 14.20% had someone living alone who was 65 years of age or older. The average household size was 2.46 and the average family size was 2.94.

In the county, the population was spread out, with 24.80% under the age of 18, 7.90% from 18 to 24, 23.50% from 25 to 44, 22.70% from 45 to 64, and 21.10% who were 65 years of age or older. The median age was 41 years. For every 100 females there were 95.10 males. For every 100 females age 18 and over, there were 92.20 males.

The median income for a household in the county was $34,500, and the median income for a family was $41,386. Males had a median income of $30,236 versus $21,119 for females. The per capita income for the county was $16,100. About 4.80% of families and 8.30% of the population were below the poverty line, including 9.50% of those under age 18 and 9.70% of those age 65 or over.

Government

Presidential elections

Laws
Following amendment to the Kansas Constitution in 1986, the county remained a prohibition, or "dry", county until 2004, when voters approved the sale of alcoholic liquor by the individual drink with a 30 percent food sales requirement.

Education

Colleges
 Tabor College, in Hillsboro
 Butler Community College (remote campus), in Marion

Unified school districts
 Centre USD 397
 Peabody–Burns USD 398
 Marion–Florence USD 408
 Hillsboro USD 410
 Goessel USD 411

Communities

Cities

 Burns (previously known as St. Francis)
 Durham (previously known as Durham Park)
 Florence
 Goessel (previously known as Gnadenfeld)
 Hillsboro (previously known as Hill City)
 Lehigh
 Lincolnville
 Lost Springs
 Marion (previously known as Marion Centre)
 Peabody (previously known as Coneburg)
 Ramona
 Tampa

Unincorporated communities
† means a Census-Designated Place (CDP) by the United States Census Bureau.
 Antelope
 Aulne
 Canada
 Eastshore†
 Marion County Lake
 Pilsen†

Ghost towns
Marion County contained early communities that have long since been abandoned.

Rail Towns / Stations / Cattle Pens
 Hampson, station, approximately 5 miles south of Florence.
 Horners (Honner), station and cattle pens, approximately 3 miles northeast of Peabody.
 Jacobs, TBD, northwest of Lost Springs.
 Oursler, station and tiny community.
 Quarry, station and limestone rock quarry, approximately 5.5 miles north of Marion.
 Wagner, TBD, southwest of Florence.
 Waldeck, station, cattle pens, and tiny community.

Oil Towns
 Watchorn, 5 miles east of Peabody.

Other
 Creswell (or Cresswell), east of Goessel
 Elk, northeast of Marion (straddled Chase County border)
 Fred, between Peabody and Hillsboro
 Kuhnbrook
 Morning Star
 Strassburg
 Youngtown, northeast of Marion

Mennonite Villages
 Alexanderfeld
 Ebenfeld
 Friedenstal (Alvin)
 Gnadenau (Grace Meadow)
 Hoffnungsthal (Hope Valley)
 Schoenthal (Fair Valley)
 Steinbach

Alexanderwohl Mennonite Villages, (see Alexanderwohl Mennonite Church)
 Blumenfeld (straddled on McPherson County border)
 Blumenort (straddled on McPherson County border)
 Emmathal
 Gnadenfeld
 Gnadenthal
 Gruenfeld (Green Field) (abandoned then later became Goessel)
 Hochfeld
 Springfield

Townships
Marion County is divided into twenty-four townships. The cities of Florence (in Doyle and Fairplay townships), Hillsboro (in Liberty and Risley townships), and Marion (in Centre township) are considered governmentally independent and are excluded from the census figures for the townships. In the following table, the population center is the largest city (or cities) included in that township's population total, if it is of a significant size.

Historical maps

Media

Print
 Hillsboro Free Press, local newspaper for Hillsboro.
 Marion County Record, local newspaper for Marion.
 Peabody Gazette-Bulletin, local newspaper for Peabody.
 Hillsboro Free Press, free newspaper for greater Marion County area.
 The Newton Kansan, regional newspaper from Newton.
 The Wichita Eagle, major regional newspaper from Wichita.

See also
 National Register of Historic Places listings in Marion County, Kansas
 Cottonwood River and Great Flood of 1951
 March 1990 Central US tornado outbreak
 Public Land Survey System
 Chisholm Trail and Route of the Trail in Kansas
 Santa Fe Trail
 Geology of Kansas

Further reading

County
 Our Nation Called : Marion County Answered – Honoring Our Marion County Kansas Veterans; Hillsboro Free Press; 192 pages; 2012.
 The Days of June : Recollections of a Country Sheriff; Tracy Mayes; Leathers Pub; 72 pages; 1999; .
 Touring Marion County : pioneers, lakes, & the mighty Santa Fe; Robert Collins; 1993.
 Marion County Kansas : Past and Present; Sondra Van Meter; MB Publishing House; 344 pages; 1972; LCCN 72-92041.
 Atlas of Marion County, Kansas: containing maps, plats of the townships, alphabetical rural directory, histories of churches, etc., families, farms, churches and pictures of general interest; Tri-Tabula Co; 1971.
 Picture Story of the Flood Waters in Marion and Vicinity; July 1951. This book contains pictures from Marion, Florence, and Peabody.
 The Scully Land System in Marion County, Kansas; Homer Socolofsky; Kansas State University; 110 pages; 1944/1947.
 World War Roll of Honor : Marion County Kansas 1917-1920; Alexander and Dean; 221 pages; 1920.
 Marion County, Kansas; Alex E. Case; 1894.
 Portrait and Biographical Record of Dickinson, Saline, McPherson, and Marion Counties, Kansas; Chapman Bros; 614 pages; 1893.
 Hand-book of Marion County, Kansas; C.S. Burch Publishing Co; 40 pages; 1888.
 All About Marion County, Kansas; E.W. Hoch; Marion County Record; 1876.
 Plat Book of Marion County, Kansas; W.W. Hixson & Co; 1928.
 Standard Atlas of Marion County, Kansas; Geo. A. Ogle & Co; 99 pages; 1921.
 Standard Atlas of Marion County, Kansas; Geo. A. Ogle & Co; 103 pages; 1902.
 Atlas of Marion County, Kansas; Davy Map and Atlas Co; 87 pages; 1885.

Education
 The Early Schools of Marion County Kansas; Wilma Stewart Stallwitz; Located at Peabody Township Library; 33 pages; 1960.
 Your School District: The Report of the National Commission on School District Reorganization; National Education Association; 286 pages; 1948. (some topics about Kansas school district consolidation)

Trails
 Marion County Auto Tour of the Santa Fe Trail; Cottonwood Crossing Chapter of Santa Fe Trail Association.; 2 pages; 2011.
 The Story of the Marking of the Santa Fe Trail by the Daughters of the American Revolution in Kansas and the State of Kansas; Almira Cordry; Crane Co; 164 pages; 1915.
 The National Old Trails Road To Southern California, Part 1 (LA to KC); Automobile Club Of Southern California; 64 pages; 1916.

Mennonite Settlements and Churches
 The Varieties of Kansas German Dialects after 150 Years of German Group Settlement in Kansas, William D. Kell, 2006.
 The Ebenfeld Church in Action, 1876–1976.
 1874 Mennonite Immigration Centennial; Mennonite Life; Mid-Year 1974.
 The Disciples of Menno Simonis: Their Settlement in Central Kansas; Frank Leslie's Illustrated; Mennonite Life; September 1999.
 Alexanderwohl Villages in Kansas, 1874 (map); P.U. Schmidt; Mennonite Life; October 1949.
 The Alexanderwohl Church Building; Alvin Gooseen; Mennonite Life; December 1974.
 Impact of Mennonite settlement on the cultural landscape of Kansas; Brenda Martin; Kansas State University; 1985/1988. 
 Mennonite settlement : the relationship between the physical and cultural environment; Susan Movle; University of Utah; 1975/1886.
 Status of Mennonite women in Kansas in their church and home relationships; Eva Harshbarger; Bluffton College; 1925/1945.
 The Disciples of Menno Simonis: Their Settlement in Central Kansas; Frank Leslie's Illustrirte Zeitung; March 20, 1875. (German version of English article)
 The Disciples of Menno Simonis: Their Settlement in Central Kansas; Frank Leslie's Illustrated; March 20, 1875. (English)

References

External links

County
 
 Marion County - Directory of Public Officials
 Marion County - Economic Development Council
Historical
 Marion County cemetery list, archive of KsGenWeb
 Marion County history bibliography, Kansas Historical Society
 Marion County school bibliography, Kansas Historical Society
 Marion County court records on microfilm, Kansas Historical Society
 History of Early Marion County Newspapers, 1916
 Detailed map of Santa Fe Trail, Pioneer trails
Maps
 Marion County maps: Current, Historic, KDOT
 Kansas Highway maps: Current, Historic, 1918, KDOT and Kansas Historical Society
 Kansas Railroad maps: Current, 1996, 1915, KDOT and Kansas Historical Society

 
Kansas counties
1855 establishments in Kansas Territory